Trespass to land is a common law tort or crime that is committed when an individual or the object of an individual intentionally (or, in Australia, negligently) enters the land of another without a lawful excuse. Trespass to land is actionable per se. Thus, the party whose land is entered upon may sue even if no actual harm is done.  In some jurisdictions, this rule may also apply to entry upon public land having restricted access.  A court may order payment of damages or an injunction to remedy the tort.

By law, trespass for mesne profits is a suit against someone who has been ejected from property that did not belong to them. The suit is for recovery of damages the trespasser caused to the property and for any profits he or she may have made while in possession of that property.

For a trespass to be actionable, the tortfeasor must voluntarily go to a specific location, but need not be aware that he entered the property of a particular person. If A forces B unwillingly onto C's land, C will not have action in trespass against B, because B's actions were involuntary. C may instead claim against A.  Furthermore, if B is deceived by A as to the ownership or boundaries of C's land, A may be jointly liable with B for B's trespass.

In most jurisdictions, if a person were to accidentally enter onto private property, there would be no trespass, because the person did not intend any violation. However, in Australia, negligence may substitute the requirement for intent.

If a trespass is actionable and no action is taken within reasonable or prescribed time limits, the land owner may forever lose the right to seek a remedy, and may even forfeit certain property rights. See Adverse possession and Easement by prescription.

Trespass may also arise upon the easement of one person upon the land of another. For example, if A grants B a right to pass freely across A's land, then A would trespass upon B's easement by erecting a locked gate or otherwise blocking B's rightful access.

In some jurisdictions trespass while in possession of a firearm, which may include a low-power air weapon without ammunition, constitutes a more grave crime of armed trespass.

The maxim "cuius est solum, eius est usque ad coelum et ad infernos" (whoever owns the land owns it all the way to heaven and to hell) is said to apply, however that has been limited by practical considerations. For example, aerial trespass is limited to airspace which might be used (therefore aeroplanes cannot be sued). Landowners may not put up structures to prevent this. The courts have been more lenient with putting up structures to prevent underground trespass. The Kentucky Court of Appeal in Edwards v Sims (1929) 24 SW 2d 619 seems to affirm the maxim without qualification, whereas the New South Wales Supreme Court in Australia seemed more reluctant to do so in Di Napoli v New Beach Apartments (2004) Aust Torts Reports 81-728. There is therefore an asymmetry between aerial and underground trespass, which may be resolved by the fact the ground is almost always used (to support buildings and other structures) whereas airspace loses its practical use above the height of skyscrapers.

There may be regulations that hold a trespasser to a higher duty of care, such as strict liability for timber trespass (removing trees beyond a permitted boundary), which is a type of trespass to chattels as a result of a trespass to land.

Some cases also provide remedies for trespass not amounting to personal presence, as where an object is intentionally deposited, or farm animals are permitted to wander upon the land of another.  Furthermore, if a new use of nearby land interferes with a land owner's quiet enjoyment of his rights, there may be an action for nuisance, as where a disagreeable aroma or noise from A drifts across the land of B.

Trespass ab initio is when a person is granted access to land but then abuses that access. The entry to the land is considered to have been a trespass from the beginning. This only applies to access given by law, not to access given by a person (as established by the Six Carpenters' Case).

Ireland
Trespass in Republic of Ireland law is similar to trespass in English law. The Criminal Justice (Public Order) Act 1994 made it an offence "for a person, without reasonable excuse, to trespass on any building or the curtilage thereof in such a manner as causes or is likely to cause fear in another person". The Criminal Law (Defence and the Dwelling) Act 2011 allows use of reasonable force against someone entering a dwelling "as a trespasser for the purpose of committing a criminal act".

United Kingdom

England and Wales

In English law, trespass to land involves the "unjustifiable interference with land which is in the immediate and exclusive possession of another". Land is defined as the surface, subsoil, airspace and anything permanently attached to the land, such as houses. It is not necessary to prove that harm was suffered to bring a claim, and is instead actionable per se. While most trespasses to land are intentional, it can also be committed negligently. Accidental trespass also incurs liability, with an exception for entering land adjoining a road unintentionally (such as in a car accident). Although previously a pure tort, the Criminal Justice and Public Order Act 1994 created some circumstances in which trespass to land can also be a crime.

Scotland
Trespass is an offence under Scots Law; however, the legislation was amended under the Land Reform (Scotland) Act 2003 which established universal access rights to most land and inland water. These reforms do not apply (hence trespass remains an offence) to:
Houses and gardens, and non-residential buildings and associated land;
Land in which crops are growing;
Land next to a school and used by the school;
Sports or playing fields when these are in use and where the exercise of access rights would interfere with such use;
Land developed and in use for recreation and where the exercise of access rights would interfere with such use;
Golf courses (although a golf course may be crossed provided no games of golf are interfered with);
Places like airfields, railways, telecommunication sites, military bases and installations, working quarries and construction sites; and
Visitor attractions or other places which charge for entry.

United States

In most states, a criminal trespass to land is defined by statute and constitutes a misdemeanor. In some states, it may be a felony under certain circumstances (e.g., trespassing on a research facility or school property).  Remedies between private parties for trespass may include an injunction or money damages.

Since 2021, the National Guard has enforced trespassing law more aggressively through Operation Lone Star. While immigrants entering at lawful entry points are processed through federal immigration authorities, this new initiative has resulted in the mass arrest of asylum seekers through enforcement of Texas state trespassing law when migrants fail to present themselves at a lawful entry point. Over a period of seven months, 40% of all Texas state police arrests were solely for trespassing.

See also
 Intrusion
 Invasion
 Trespass
 Right of way
 Adverse possession
 Public nuisance
 Freedom to roam

References

Tort law
Real property law
Anti-protest law